"I'd Rather Go Blind" is a blues song written by Ellington Jordan and co-credited to Billy Foster and Etta James. It was first recorded by Etta James in 1967, released in 1967, and has subsequently become regarded as a blues and soul classic.

Original version by Etta James
Etta James wrote in her autobiography Rage To Survive that she heard the song outlined by her friend Ellington "Fugi" Jordan when she visited him in prison. She then wrote the rest of the song with Jordan, but for tax reasons gave her songwriting credit to her partner at the time, Billy Foster, singer with doo-wop group The Medallions.

Etta James recorded the song at the FAME Studios in Muscle Shoals, Alabama. It was included on the album Tell Mama and as the B-side of the single of the same name which made number 10 on the Billboard R&B charts, and number 23 on the Billboard Hot 100. The song is also on the 1978 Jerry Wexler-produced album Deep in the Night, but there it is titled "Blind Girl" (track 10). Some critics have regarded "I'd Rather Go Blind" as of such emotional and poetic quality as to make that release one of the great double-sided singles of the period. Critic Dave Marsh put the song in his book The Heart of Rock and Soul: The 1001 Greatest Singles Ever Made. Noting that James had recorded the song during a break from heroin addiction, Marsh writes, "the song provides a great metaphor for her drug addiction and intensifies the story."

Certifications

Sydney Youngblood version

A version of the song was America/German singer Sydney Youngblood's third single release, peaking at number 44 on the UK Singles Chart.  It was Youngblood's only US pop chart appearance, making it to number 46 on the Billboard Hot 100 in October 1990, and the first of two minor hits on the Hot R&B Singles chart, peaking at number 42.

Charts

Other versions
It has since been recorded by a wide variety of artists, including the blind-from-birth Clarence Carter, on his 1969 album The Dynamic Clarence Carter. Other recordings include those by Little Milton, Chicken Shack, Koko Taylor, Man Man, Rod Stewart, B.B. King, Elkie Brooks, Paul Weller, Trixie Whitley, Ruby Turner, Marcia Ball, Barbara Lynn, and Beyoncé for the Cadillac Records film soundtrack.

The song reached number 14 on the UK Singles Chart in 1969 in a version by the British blues band Chicken Shack, featuring Christine Perfect, later to become Christine McVie of Fleetwood Mac.  After she left Chicken Shack, but before she joined Fleetwood Mac, Christine also recorded her own version of the song for her debut solo album, the eponymous Christine Perfect album.

The song was also recorded in 1972 for Never a Dull Moment, the fourth album by Rod Stewart. Etta James refers to Stewart's version favorably in her autobiography, Rage to Survive.

Versions have been performed by Paolo Nutini, Australian musician Toby, and American folk singer Holly Miranda.

British soul singer Liam Bailey released a home-recorded version of the song with his EP 2am Rough Tracks in 2010. The EP was released on Lioness Records.

In 2011, Joe Bonamassa and Beth Hart included the song on their album Don't Explain. At the 2012 Kennedy Center Honors concert honoring Buddy Guy, Beth Hart received a standing ovation for a rendition of the song accompanied by Jeff Beck on guitar.

In 2012, Mick Hucknall recorded the song for his album American Soul.

The Allman Brothers performed this song live occasionally with Susan Tedeschi. Tedeschi and Allman Brothers guitarists Derek Trucks and Warren Haynes performed their version of the song at The White House's Red White and Blues event in 2012.

Paloma Faith performed the song as a duet with Ty Taylor at the BBC Proms in 2014.

The near note-for-note rendition of the song's melody can be heard in Chris Stapleton's 2015 track "Tennessee Whiskey".

A rocksteady version was recorded by The Frightnrs for Daptone Records in 2015.

Dua Lipa performed a live version of the song in 2017 for her compilation EP Live Acoustic.

In 2018, Grace Potter recorded the song at FAME Studios for the tribute album Muscle Shoals...Small Town, Big Sound.

References

Etta James songs
Sydney Youngblood songs
1967 songs
Cadet Records singles
1968 singles